Tojolabal or Tojolabʼal may refer to:
 Tojolabal people, an ethnic group of Mexico
 Tojolabʼal language, a Mayan language

Language and nationality disambiguation pages